is a river located in the Yamanashi Prefecture of Japan. It is a tributary of the Fuji River.

Geography 
The  Fuefuki River has its source the neighboring mountains of Mount Kobushi on the southern slope of Mount Kobushi in the north of Yamanashi, on Honshu, in Japan. Its course takes a southeast direction to the Hirose dam then south, in the east of Yamanashi. Leaving Yamanashi, it successively crosses the northwest of Fuefuki to which it gives its name, south of Kōfu, central Chūō and the northwest of the town of Ichikawamisato. Near the boundary between Ichikawamisato and Fujikawa, the Fuefuki and Kamanashi rivers converge and form the Fuji River.

References 

Rivers of Yamanashi Prefecture
Rivers of Japan